The men's coxed four competition at the 1972 Summer Olympics in Munich took place from 27 August to 2 September at the Olympic Reggatta Course in Oberschleißheim. There were 14 boats (70 competitors) from 14 nations, with each nation limited to a single boat in the event. The event was won by West Germany; it was the nation's first medal as a separate team, but the third time in four Games that a West German crew had won gold (with crews from West Germany winning in 1960 and 1964 under the flag of the United Team of Germany). East Germany repeated as silver medallists, though with a new crew. Bronze went to Czechoslovakia, the nation's first medal in the men's coxed four since 1952.

Background

This was the 14th appearance of the event. Rowing had been on the programme in 1896 but was cancelled due to bad weather. The coxed four was one of the four initial events introduced in 1900. It was not held in 1904 or 1908, but was held at every Games from 1912 to 1992 when it (along with the men's coxed pair) was replaced with the men's lightweight double sculls and men's lightweight coxless four.

New Zealand's victory at the 1968 Olympics had been a surprise; teams from both East and West Germany had been dominant before then (winning the 1960 and 1964 Olympics, 1962 and 1966 World Championships, and most of the European championships). The Germans continued their form between Mexico City and Munich, with West Germany winning and East Germany the runner-up at the 1970 World Championship, along with both the 1969 and 1971 European championships. The two German crews were heavily favoured again at the 1972 Games.

For the third time in five Games, no nations made their debut in the event. The United States made its 12th appearance, most among nations to that point.

Competition format

The coxed four event featured five-person boats, with four rowers and a coxswain. It was a sweep rowing event, with the rowers each having one oar (and thus each rowing on one side). The competition used the 2000 metres distance that became standard at the 1912 Olympics and which has been used ever since except at the 1948 Games.

The tournament used the four-round format (three main rounds and a repechage) that had been used in 1968. The competition continued to use the six-boat heat standardised in 1960 as well as the "B" final for ranking 7th through 12th place introduced in 1964.

 Quarterfinals: Three heats of 4 or 5 boats each. The top three boats in each heat (9 total) advanced directly to the semifinals. The remaining boats (5 total) went to the repechage.
 Repechage: One heat of 5 boats each. The top three boats rejoined the quarterfinal winners in the semifinals. The other boats (2 total) were eliminated.
 Semifinals: Two heats of 6 boats each. The top three boats in each heat (6 total) advanced to Final A, the remaining boats (6 total) went to Final B.
 Final: Two finals. Final A consisted of the top 6 boats. Final B placed boats 7 through 12.

Schedule

All times are Central European Time (UTC+1)

Results

Quarterfinals

The top three of each heat advanced to the semifinal round; the remainder went to the repechage.

Quarterfinal 1

Quarterfinal 2

Quarterfinal 3

Repechage

The top three finishers advanced to the semifinal round.

Semifinals

First three qualify to the Final A, remainder to Final B.

Semifinal 1

Semifinal 2

Finals

Final B

Final A

References

External links
 Official reports of the 1972 Summer Olympics

Men's coxed four